Max E. Bacon (born June 6, 1941) was a member of the Missouri House of Representatives from 1970 until 1974 and then served as a Greene County, Missouri circuit judge from 1976 until February 1988 when he was re-elected.

Education 
Bacon is a native of Springfield, Missouri, where he attended public school. He graduated from Southwest Missouri State University with a B.S. in education, and from the University of Missouri, where he received his law degree.

Career 
He was admitted to the bar in 1968. He served as a prosecuting attorney in two Missouri counties before being elected as a Democrat to the Missouri House of Representatives.

Personal life 
He and his wife, Jenine, and their three children live in Springfield and attend the Broadway Baptist Church. - see White House Reference

Singing 
Bacon wrote music and sang with future attorney general John Ashcroft. In 1973 they recorded and released a gospel album entitled Truth: Volume One, Edition One. In 1977 they co-wrote, produced, and recorded In the Spirit of Life and Liberty. The song "Let the Eagle Soar" has been long associated with John Ashcroft. - See Reference John Ashcroft Biography

Bacon was a member of the Ozark Mountain Jubilee - Bacon Family Singers.
- see Reference Bacon Family Singers

Bacon and his family were often on stage. The Bacons had 16 seasons in Branson at the Grand Country Music Hall Complex. They performed in both the Sunday Gospel Jubilee show, at 2pm, and the Ozark Mountain Jubilee show, at 7pm, every Sunday, February to December.

References

Missouri lawyer directory for Associate Circuit Judge Max Bacon
Ozark Mountain Jubilee and the Sunday Gospel Jubilee website
 

1941 births
Living people
Politicians from Springfield, Missouri
Missouri lawyers
Democratic Party members of the Missouri House of Representatives
American gospel singers
Missouri state court judges